Pat Donnelly (born February 24, 1953) is an American former professional ice hockey player.

During the 1975–76 season, Donnelly played 23 games in the World Hockey Association with the Cincinnati Stingers.

As a youth, he played in the 1965 Quebec International Pee-Wee Hockey Tournament with the Detroit Roostertail minor ice hockey team.

References

External links

1953 births
Living people
Cincinnati Stingers players
Hampton Aces players
Hampton Gulls (AHL) players
Hampton Gulls (SHL) players
Ice hockey people from Detroit
Long Island Cougars players
San Francisco Shamrocks players
American men's ice hockey centers